Justice Hubbell may refer to:

Levi Hubbell, associate justice of the Wisconsin Supreme Court
Webster Hubbell, chief justice of the Arkansas Supreme Court